Peruvian Debate Society (commonly known as PDS) is an inter-university student association headquartered in Lima, Peru, aimed to promote debate and discussion on current national and international issues in order to form leading citizens who contribute to development by participating in Model United Nations (MUN) conferences around the globe, especially the ones organized by the Harvard International Relations Council. Beginning its participation in international conferences in 2015, it gained widespread recognition by achieving in their debut the Best Large Delegation Award at the Harvard National Model United Nations - Latin America 2015. Subsequently, the team has won the conference in the 2016, 2018, and 2019 editions. Since its foundation in 2014, their participation at national and international level has yielded multiple awards, consistently being ranked as the best Model UN team in the nation and one of the top international debate teams in the world.

In the 2017–18 MUN season, PDS achieved for the first time the Best Large Delegation Award at Harvard World Model United Nations 2018 held in Panama City, Panama, being the second Peruvian MUN team in achieving such international recognition. The following season, the team achieved the Outstanding Large Delegation Award at the same conference, held in this occasion at Madrid, Spain.

Most recently, the team attained the Best Small Delegation award at the Harvard World Model United Nations 2022, sharing the title with rival delegation Peruvian Universities (PU).

Board of Directors

Peruvian Debate Society was constituted as a non-profit civil association for the promotion of education in Peru, in 2017. As an organization, it is composed by Associates, which in turn make-up the General Assembly, presided by the Board of Directors (composed of four elected associates).

The current Board of Directors is led by Alvaro César Peña Villanueva, former Delegate, Faculty Advisor, and Deputy Chairman of the Board of Directors (2020-2021).

The PDS Association is formally established under an official Constitution Act and Statute, to which every Associate is subject to its rule.

2017–2018

2018–2019

2019–2020

2020–2021

2021–2022

2022–2023

Faculty Advisors
Chief Advisors in bold

2014–2015 season

2015–2016 season

2016–2017 season

2017–2018 season

2018–2019 season

2019–2020 season

2020–2021 season

2021–2022 season

2022–2023 season

Harvard National Model United Nations Participation

Harvard World Model United Nations Participation 

Since 2018, Peruvian Debate Society alumni have started to participate in Harvard World Model United Nations as part of the Substantial Affairs Team.

Harvard National Model United Nations - Latin America Participation 

Since 2017, Peruvian Debate Society alumni have started to participate in Harvard National Model United Nations Latin America as part of the Substantial Affairs Team.

Universidad del Rosario Model United Nations Participation 
{| class="wikitable"
!Session
!Year
!Representing
!Faculty Advisors
!Individual Awards
!Delegation Awards
|-
|6
|2015
| Republic of South Africa
|Martín GallardoCarlos Santibáñez
|6 Best DelegatesAugusto Dannon (SOCHUM)Gabriela Delgado (WHO)Angel Gómez (UNSA)Gianluca VenegasGabriel ReyMatías García2 Outstanding DelegatesMaría Angélica MenesesAlonso Torres Llosa1 Honorable MentionRafaela Tord1 Verbal CommendationDaniela Rizo-Patrón
|style="background:#98FB98;text-align:center;"|Best Large Delegation
|-
|8
|2017
| Russian Federation Union of Soviet Socialist Republics
|Youssef Abi-fadelJorge Alfonso RamírezAugusto Dannon
|2 Best DelegatesRodrigo Guzmán / Inés Bullard (DISEC)Francesca Sabroso (UN Women)4 Outstanding DelegatesValeria Adrianzén (HGA)Daniela Sibina / Jimena Ayala (SOCHUM)Fabio Macedo (IAEA)André Díaz (UNSC)1 Honorable MentionLuis Olazábal (CIS)
|style="background:#98FB98;text-align:center;"|Best Medium Delegation
|-
|9
|2018
| Arab Republic of Egypt Republic of Turkey
 El Comercio
|Juan Luis SalinasFabiana Chávez
|
|style="background:#98FB98;text-align:center;"|Best Medium Delegation
|-
|10
|2019
|
|Karina CamposFabio MacedoInés Bullard
|3 Best DelegatesMiguel Kantor (UNCLOS)Daniela Azmouz (UNICRI)Alejandro Céspedes (UN Journal)2 Outstanding DelegatesMauricio Barrios (LoN)Valeria Gamio (APA)
|style="background:#98FB98;text-align:center;"|Best Medium Delegation
|-

Since 2016, Peruvian Debate Society alumni have started to participate in MUNUR as part of the Substantial Affairs Team.

Oxford International Model United Nations Participation 
Since 2018, Peruvian Debate Society alumni have started to participate in OxIMUN as part of the Substantial Affairs Team.

National Model United Nations Circuit Participation

Pontificia Universidad Católica del Perú Model United Nations (PUCPMUN) 

Since 2018, Peruvian Debate Society alumni have started to participate in PUCPMUN as part of the Substantial Affairs Team.

Universidad del Pacífico Model United Nations (UPMUN) 

Since 2016, Peruvian Debate Society alumni have started to participate in UPMUN as part of the Substantial Affairs Team.

Universidad San Ignacio de Loyola Model United Nations (USILMUN) 

Since 2016, Peruvian Debate Society alumni have started to participate in USILMUN as part of the Substantial Affairs Team.

Universidad Privada del Norte Model United Nations (UPNMUN)

International Delegation of Peru Model United Nations (IDPMUN) 

Since 2016, Peruvian Debate Society alumni have started to participate in IDPMUN as part of the Substantial Affairs Team.

Modelo de Naciones Unidas del Perú (MONUP)

See also
 Model United Nations
 United Schools of Peru (MUN)
 Promotora Internacional de Debates - Perú
 Peruvian Universities (MUN)
 Harvard International Relations Council
 Harvard World Model United Nations

References

Student debating societies